Following is an incomplete list of past and present Members of Parliament (MPs) of the United Kingdom whose surnames begin with W.  The dates in parentheses are the periods for which they were MPs.

WA
 Thomas Waite (1646–1648)
 John Wakeham (1974–1992)
Robin Walker
 Joan Walley (1987–2015)
Samuel Waterhouse
Tom Watson
George Ward
 John Ward (1906–1929)
 William Ward (1826–1831)
 George Wardle (1906–1920)
WE
 Mike Weatherley  (2010–2015)
Sidney Webb, 1st Baron Passfield (1922–1929)
 Paul Wentworth
 Andrew Western
WH
 James Wharton
John Wheatley (1922–1930)
Heather Wheeler
Chris White
Eilidh Whiteford
Alan Whitehead
 William Whiteley (1922–1931), (1935–1955)
WI
 Malcolm Wicks (1992–2012)
 James Wignall (1918–1925)
 Ellen Wilkinson (1924–1931), (1935–1947)
David Willetts
Arthur Willey (1922–1923)
Roger Williams
Stephen Williams

Gavin Williamson
 Jenny Willott (2005–2015)
Wilfrid Wills (1931–1935)
 David Wilshire (1987–2010)
 Arnold Wilson (1933–1940)
Sir Charles Wilson (1923–1929)
 Harold Wilson (1945–1983)
Richard Fountayne Wilson
Sammy Wilson
 Joseph Havelock Wilson (1892–1900), (1906–1910), (1918–1922)
Thomas Wing (1910)
Rowland Winn, 2nd Baron St Oswald
Henry Winterbotham
 Sir Nicholas Winterton (1971–2010)
 Dame Rosie Winterton (1997–present)
Margaret Wintringham
WO
 Sir Walter Womersley, 1st Baronet (1924–1945)
Charles Wood, 1st Viscount Halifax
Leanne Wood
Sir Matthew Wood, 1st Baronet

William Wood
Phil Woolas (1997–2010)
Ken Woolmer (1979-1983)
Sidney Woolf
WR

 David Wright

WY
 Woodrow Wyatt (1945–1955), (1959–1970)

 W